This is a list of wealthy Americans ranked by net worth. It is based on an annual assessment of wealth and assets by Forbes and by data from the Bloomberg Billionaires Index.

The Forbes 400 Richest Americans list has been published annually since 1982. The combined net worth of the 2020 class of the 400 richest Americans was $3.2 trillion, up from $2.7 trillion in 2017. As of October 2020, there were 614 billionaires in the United States.

Top 25 richest Americans
According to Forbes, as of January 2023, the 25 wealthiest people in the United States are as follows:

Other wealthy Americans 
According to the Bloomberg Billionaires Index, each of the following Americans had a net worth of more than $10 billion and less than $40 billion as of March 2018:

According to the Bloomberg Billionaires Index, each of the following Americans had a net worth of more than $4 billion and less than $10 billion as of March 2018:

See also
 The World's Billionaires
 List of countries by the number of billionaires

References

External links
 Bloomberg Billionaires Index 
 Forbes 400 - The Richest People in America - 2018 list

400 (2018)
Lists of 21st-century people
Net worth
 
Economy of the United States-related lists